KGWP (91.1 FM) is a radio station licensed to Pittsburg, Texas, United States. The station is owned by Andres Serranos Ministries, Inc.

History
The station went on the air as KKXI in 2003.  On 16 December 2005, the station changed its call sign to the current KGWP.

References

External links

GWP
Radio stations established in 2003
2003 establishments in Texas